Kim Jong-hoon (Korean: 김종훈; Hanja: 金鍾勳; born 3 July 1964) is a South Korean politician. He is the current Floor Leader of the Minjung Party. He was the only Minjung Party member in the National Assembly until he lost his seat in the 2020 elections.

Early life and education 
Kim Jong-hoon was born on July 3, 1964. He graduated from Ulsan University.

Political career

Member of Ulsan Metropolitan Council and Mayor (2002–2011) 
Kim was elected as a member to the Ulsan Metropolitan Council in 2002 as a member of the Democratic Labor Party.

During the 18th South Korean legislative election in 2008, he planned to run for the Ulsan Dong-gu constituency, but withdrew is candidacy and endorsed Noh Ok-hee of the New Progressive Party.

He became the mayor of Dong-gu in 2011 through snap elections that were held for the position.

Representative of Dong-gu district (2016–present) 
After the dissolution of the Unified Progressive Party in 2014, Kim was an Independent. He later ran in the 20th South Korean legislative election in 2016 as an Independent and was elected representative of Dong-gu.

In 2017, along with Yoon Jong-o, Kim established the New People's Party in an attempt to unite progressive politicians in South Korea. He served as the leader of the New People's Party until its merger with the People's United Party. On December 22, 2017 he became the Floor Leader of the Minjung Party after Yoon Jong-o became involved in an election fraud scandal. He has announced that he will be running for representative of Dong-gu in the upcoming 2020 South Korean legislative election, which he later lost.

Personal life 
Kim is not married nor does he have any children. He is the author of two books. His hobbies include watching soccer and hiking.

Controversy 
On April 15, 2016, former representative of Dong-gu; Ahn Hyo-dae reported Kim for election fraud to the Supreme Prosecutors' Office of the Republic of Korea. All charges against Kim were later dropped.

References 

1964 births
Living people